Carl Venne (July 20, 1946 – February 15, 2009), whose Crow name was Aashiise Dakatak Baacheitchish, was, until his death, the chairman of the executive branch of the Crow Nation. He won a November 2002 special election held after the September 2002 resignation of Chairman Clifford Birdinground. Venne was sworn into office on November 12, 2002. He served until his death on February 15, 2009. Venne served on the Montana Meth Project and Advisory Council of the State of Montana Department of Corrections.

Venne died on February 15, 2009, aged 62. He had two daughters and one son. He served with the US Army during the Vietnam War.

References

External links 
 Crow Nation says goodbye to leader

1946 births
2009 deaths
Crow tribe
Chairpersons of the Crow Nation
Native American leaders
People from Helena, Montana
20th-century Native Americans
21st-century Native Americans